Esmail Kandi-ye Do (also Romanized as Esmā‘īl Kandī-ye Do) is a village in Qeshlaq-e Gharbi Rural District, Aslan Duz District, Parsabad County, Ardabil Province, Iran. At the 2006 census, its population was 150, in 30 families.

References 

Towns and villages in Parsabad County